Carlos Camacho is the former Governor of Guam. 

Carlos Camacho may also refer to:

Carlos S. Camacho (born 1937), former Northern Mariana Islands governor
 Carlos Camacho (actor) (born 1971), Colombian actor
Carlos Camacho Lutman (born 1994), footballer